Annay (also referred to as Annay-sous-Lens, literally Annay under Lens) is a commune in the Pas-de-Calais department in the Hauts-de-France region of France.

Geography
The canalized Deûle river forms much of the northeast border of the commune.

Population

Sights
 The church of St. Amé, rebuilt, as was most of the village, after the First World War.
 The war memorial.
 An abandoned protestant church.

See also
Communes of the Pas-de-Calais department

References

External links

 Website of the Communaupole de Lens-Liévin 

Communes of Pas-de-Calais
Artois